The American Magazine of Useful and Entertaining Knowledge (1834–1837) was a monthly magazine based in Boston, Massachusetts. It was established by a group of engravers to "give to the public a work descriptive, not merely of subjects, scenes, places, and persons existing in distant climes, but also of those which are to be found in our own fine and native country." It featured profusely illustrated articles on many topics, including American animals, plants, natural scenery, colleges, banks, hospitals, churches, cities, technology, and so on; as well as biographical articles on figureheads of the revolutionary and federal eras. Modelled after the British Penny Magazine, it was published first by the Boston Bewick Company, then by William D. Ticknor and John L. Sibley. In 1836 Nathaniel Hawthorne served as editor.

References

Further reading
 American Magazine of Useful and Entertaining Knowledge. v.1 (1834–1835); v.2 (1835–1836); v.3 (1836–1837).

External links

 Hathi Trust. American Magazine of Useful and Entertaining Knowledge

19th century in Boston
1830s in the United States
Local interest magazines published in the United States
Monthly magazines published in the United States
Defunct magazines published in the United States
Magazines established in 1834
Magazines disestablished in 1837
Magazines published in Boston